The Kuydusun (Kuyduhun) is a river in Sakha Republic (Yakutia), Russia. It is one of the major tributaries of the Indigirka.

The river flows south of the Arctic Circle, across desolate tundra territories of the Oymyakonsky District marked by permafrost. Kuydusun village is located by the banks of the lower course of the river and Tomtor further north, near its mouth.

Course
The Kuydusun is a left tributary of the Indigirka. It has its sources in the northeastern slopes of the Suntar-Khayata, at the border with Khabarovsk Krai. The river flows roughly in a northern direction across the mountainous territory, then turns northeastwards into a plain of the Yana-Oymyakon Highlands filled with lakes where it meanders and divides into multiple channels. In its final stretch the river turns again northwards. Finally the Kuydusun joins the left bank of the Indigirka  from its mouth.

Tributaries  
The river is frozen between early October and the end of May.

See also
List of rivers of Russia

References

External links 
Fishing & Tourism in Yakutia
[https://yakutiamedia.ru/news/606565/ Воды реки Куйдусун размыли мостовой переход на дороге "Оймякон" в Якутии
Подробнее: https://yakutiamedia.ru/news/606565/ (bridge destroyed by floodwaters)]
Мост через реку Куйдусун восстановят на следующей неделе (repairing bridge over the river)

Tributaries of the Indigirka
Rivers of the Sakha Republic
Suntar-Khayata